Oseka is a rural locality (a village) in Nikolskoye Rural Settlement, Kaduysky District, Vologda Oblast, Russia. The population was 3 as of 2002.

Geography 
Oseka is located 63 km northwest of Kaduy (the district's administrative centre) by road. Tarasovskaya is the nearest rural locality.

References 

Rural localities in Kaduysky District